Peter Jericevich is a Scotland Club XV international rugby union player who has played for Doncaster Knights in the English RFU Championship. Peter is a former Scotland Age Group International and Scotland Under 19 Player of the Season (2007/08). He has also played for the Scotland 7 a side team, representing his country in six tournaments in the 2009/10 season. He is also the younger brother of Tane Jericevich, a professional rugby coach for The Austin Herd in the United States Major League Rugby Competition.

References

Living people
Scottish rugby union players
Doncaster R.F.C. players
Place of birth missing (living people)
Glasgow Hutchesons Aloysians RFC players
Glasgow Warriors players
Glasgow Hawks players
Ayr RFC players
1989 births
Scotland Club XV international rugby union players
Rugby union scrum-halves